Stourport Boat Club is a rowing club on the River Severn, based at the Riverside, Dunley Road, Stourport-on-Severn, Worcestershire.

History
The club was founded in 1876 and is affiliated to British Rowing. The main pastime of the club when it was founded was boating which resulted in the name that the club still retains today instead of being known as a rowing club.

The club has produced multiple British champions.

Honours

British champions

Note: * composite

References

Sport in Worcestershire
Rowing clubs in England
Rowing clubs of the River Severn
Stourport-on-Severn